Třebušín is a municipality and village in Litoměřice District in the Ústí nad Labem Region of the Czech Republic. It has about 600 inhabitants.

Administrative parts
Villages of Dolní Týnec, Horní Týnec, Kotelice and Řepčice are administrative parts of Třebušín.

References

External links

Villages in Litoměřice District